Liam Dunn (November 12, 1916 – April 11, 1976) was an American character actor.

Life and career
The New Jersey native's early career was spent in television in series such as Bonanza, Room 222, Alias Smith and Jones, Mannix, Emergency! [S5Ep18] as "Amos", and Gunsmoke.

Dunn's breakout role was as the judge (and Barbra Streisand's character's father) in the 1972 film What's Up, Doc?, for which he was noticed by Mel Brooks, who was in the process of forming a stock company of actors. Dunn went on to appear in Brooks films, including Blazing Saddles (1974) as Rev. Johnson, Young Frankenstein (1974) as Mr. Hilltop, and as the Newsvendor in Silent Movie (1976). He also appeared in several Walt Disney productions, such as The World's Greatest Athlete (1973), Charley and the Angel (1973), Herbie Rides Again (1974) and Gus (1976).

He frequently portrayed characters who were verbally and/or physically abused in a slapstick way. Additional television credits include Twigs, All in the Family, Barney Miller, McMillan & Wife, Rhoda, Sanford and Son, and The Mary Tyler Moore Show, S4Ep6. Additional film credits included roles in Catch-22 (1970), The Great Northfield Minnesota Raid (1972), A Reflection of Fear (1972), Emperor of the North Pole (1973), Papillon (1973), Killer Bees (1974), Bank Shot (1974), At Long Last Love (1975), The Night That Panicked America (1975), Peeper (1976) and High Velocity (1976).

Liam was a warm and witty presence and occasionally enjoyed smoking pot with his young friends. However, he had serious emphysema and often had to use oxygen, from a relatively small, green tank. Nevertheless, he always smoked cigarettes. Asked why, he replied "I can't stop."

Dunn collapsed on the set of Disney's The Shaggy D.A. (1976) during the filming of the roller rink sequence, and as soon as he was hospitalized, died on April 11, 1976, from emphysema in Granada Hills, California. John Fiedler was brought in to complete the role as dog catcher. Though only 59 at the time of his death, Dunn always looked much older than he was, and he was cast accordingly.

Filmography

References

External links
 
 

1916 births
1976 deaths
American male film actors
American male television actors
Deaths from emphysema
Male actors from New Jersey
20th-century American male actors
American male comedy actors